Holly Springs High School (HSHS) is a public high school located in Holly Springs, North Carolina, United States. It is part of the Wake County Public School System.

Athletics
Holly Springs High School is a member of the North Carolina High School Athletic Association (NCHSAA) and competes at the 4A level in the South Wake Athletic Conference (SWAC). The student section is nicknamed the Purple Craze.  

The Hawks’ baseball team, led by Carlos Rodón, won the state championship in 2011 after defeating T. C. Roberson High School.  

Traditional rivals include Fuquay-Varina High School, Middle Creek High School, and Apex Friendship High School.

Athletic teams

Fall
Football
Men's soccer
Volleyball
Cross country
Women's golf
Cheer
Women's tennis

Winter
Men's basketball
Women's basketball
Swimming
Wrestling
Indoor track

Spring
Baseball
Softball
Women's soccer
Track and field
Men's lacrosse
Women's lacrosse
Men's golf
Men's tennis
Stunt

Notable alumni
 Andrew Capobianco, American Olympic diver
 Kiara Leslie, WNBA player
 Carlos Rodón, MLB pitcher
Susana Žigante, American-born Croatian soccer player
Andrew Wantz, MLB pitcher

References

External links
 

Educational institutions in the United States with year of establishment missing
Public high schools in North Carolina
Schools in Wake County, North Carolina
Wake County Public School System
2006 establishments in North Carolina
Educational institutions established in 2006